The 1989 Yugoslavian motorcycle Grand Prix was the eighth round of the 1989 Grand Prix motorcycle racing season. It took place on the weekend of 9–11 June 1989 at the Automotodrom Grobnik circuit, near Rijeka.

500 cc race report
Another pole for Kevin Schwantz, but Wayne Rainey gets a little gap after the light, and is chased by Eddie Lawson, Schwantz, Kevin Magee and Pierfrancesco Chili. Soon, the usual trio develops at the front. Lawson takes the lead, but makes a mistake and goes off-track, letting Schwantz and Rainey through and getting dropped from the leading group, though remaining in the third place.

Schwantz wants a win and Rainey wants as many riders between him and Lawson, so Schwantz has to earn the gap he gets from Rainey.  Magee and Sarron fight for fourth.

Schwantz wins it ahead of Rainey and Lawson, and Rainey pulls ahead slightly in the standings.

500 cc classification

References

Yugoslav motorcycle Grand Prix
Yugoslavian
June 1989 sports events in Europe
1989 in Yugoslav sport
1989 in Croatian sport